Rodbourne is a suburb of Swindon in Wiltshire, England, north of the town centre and about  northwest of Swindon railway station. It includes an area formerly called Even Swindon.

Northern area
Land to the north of the Wilts and Berks Canal and the Swindon-Cheltenham railway was part of Rodbourne Cheney civil parish until 1928 when the parish was dissolved and the area transferred to Swindon municipal borough. This area forms part of Rodbourne Cheney electoral ward.

The Anglican church of St Mary has 13th-century origins but was rebuilt in 1848.

Even Swindon
Before the expansion of the town, Even Swindon was a hamlet just south of the canal and the Swindon-Cheltenham railway; it was a tithing of Rodbourne Cheney parish. Housing began to be built in the 1870s and in 1890 the land was transferred to the municipal borough of Swindon. This area forms part of the Mannington and Western electoral ward.

Although Even Swindon still appears on some maps, by the early 21st century the area was considered to be part of Rodbourne.

There is a primary school, Even Swindon Primary School.

The Anglican church of St Augustine was built in 1908.

References

External links
 Your Rodbourne, Swindon Advertiser

Populated places in Wiltshire
Swindon